The Heron Rookery in Porter County, Indiana, was set aside to protect the nesting grounds of the great blue heron (Ardea herodias). In 1982, the Youth Conservation Corp constructed the trail and parking at the east side of the unit on County Road 600 E.

Location
Pine Township in Porter County, Indiana. The east parking area, which is better developed, is reached from U.S. 20 near the Town of Pines.

The rookery is also accessible from Chesterton, Indiana, from State Route 49 and Indian Boundary Road.

Trail
The most enjoyable season to visit the rookery is when the great blue herons are nesting. From the east parking area, you can follow the trail northwards to the East Arm Little Calumet River. Across the river on the north bank is the rookery. Annually, these great birds return to nest. The great blue heron is the largest of the North American heron families. It is best to visit with a ranger on a guide walk as the birds can be hard to find, high in their nests. If you continue west along the trail, you’ll follow the Little Calumet River for over a mile through a hardwood forest.

The herons roost in the eastern end with its tall sycamores.  As you move towards the west, the woods become denser with beech, tulip poplars and maples.  Here, there are a variety of smaller birds, including kinglets, wood thrushes, woodpeckers, and warblers.

Terrain
The soils through this part of Porter County are Whitaker-Milford-Del Rey soils, consistent with the hypothesis that this area was an embayment of Glenwood phase of Glacial Lake Chicago (Ancestral Lake Michigan). (Chrzastowski and Thompson, 1992)  The soils are nearly level and somewhat poorly drained.

Along the Little Calumet, the soils are fluvaquents.  They are deep, somewhat poorly drained, particularly on bottom lands. They do have a moderate ability to hold water, but with only a moderate organic content.  These types of soils remain mostly in forest as they are not well suited for crops.  For use as pastures, they would need to be protected from flooding.  In addition, these soils are not well suited for roads, construction or septic systems.  Thus along the river way, little has been developed as farms or housing.

Most of the adjacent areas are made up of Bourbon, sandy loam.  Large tracts parallel the river on both sides. They are nearly level, deep, but poorly drained soil.  They have an increased ability to move water downward or laterally with a high organic matter content. They are subject to seasonally high water.  Thus, it is better not to visit the rookery after a heavy rain fall or during winter and spring rainy seasons.  This area has remained a tree lot as it was not adequately drained for other uses. 
Sebewa soils act as drains across the surround Bourbon soils to the river.  Nearly level but slightly depressed below the surrounding soils.  They are very poorly drained and are often have standing water.  Larger tracts of this type of soil can be used for row crops, but not the limited sizes found in the rookery.

References

External links
U.S. National Park Service: Indiana Dunes National Park Heron Rookery

Protected areas of Porter County, Indiana
Indiana Dunes National Park
Nature reserves in Indiana